Triumph of the Ten Gladiators ( is a 1964 peplum film written and directed  by Nick Nostro and starring Dan Vadis. It is the sequel of Gianfranco Parolini's The Ten Gladiators, and was followed by Spartacus and the Ten Gladiators.

Plot
When the ten gladiators arrive in Antioch they are approached by a man disguised as a beggar, who throws a bag of gold at them saying a man has got work for them and they should follow him, not too closely, to the man's house. The owner of the house introduces himself as Publius Quintilius Rufus, pro consul of the emperor in Syria, and offers them a contract to put on a series of spectacles at the court of queen Moluya of Arbela. Arbela is now a neutral kingdom between Roman territory and Parthia, Rome's bitterest enemies, and queen Moluya's prime minister has concluded a pact with the Parthian king to allow his armies to pass across the frontier. One of Publius's men, Centurion Marcus Glaucus, unknown to the Parthians, will accompany them officially as the eleventh gladiator to the capital city so he can find out exactly what the situation there is. The ten gladiators, whose loyalty is without question, accept the job and agree to leave for Arbela at daybreak. With war inevitable between Rome and Parthia, unbeknown to the ten gladiators, their real mission is to kidnap the ambitious queen Meluya, and take her back to Syria as a hostage for Rome.

Cast
 Dan Vadis as Rocca
 Helga Liné as Regina Moluya 
 Stelio Candelli as Glauco Marcio  
 Gianni Rizzo as Sesto Vetullio 
 Halina Zalewska as Myrta 
 Enzo Fiermonte as Rizio 
 Leontine May as Selima 
 Carlo Tamberlani as  Publio Rufo 
 Ivano Staccioli as Arimandro 
 Emilio Messina as Lepto  
 Ugo Sasso 
 Aldo Canti
 Salvatore Borghese
 Franco Pesce

Release
Triumph of the Ten Gladiators was released in Italy on 26 November 1964.

Notes

References

External links
 

Peplum films
1960s adventure films
Films directed by Nick Nostro
Films about gladiatorial combat
Films set in ancient Rome
Films with screenplays by Nick Nostro
Sword and sandal films
Italian sequel films
1960s Italian films